In probability theory, the Azuma–Hoeffding inequality (named after Kazuoki Azuma and Wassily Hoeffding) gives a concentration result for the values of martingales that have bounded differences.

Suppose  is a martingale (or super-martingale) and

almost surely. Then for all positive integers N and all positive reals ,

And symmetrically (when Xk is a sub-martingale):

If X is a martingale, using both inequalities above and applying the union bound allows one to obtain a two-sided bound:

Proof
The proof shares similar idea of the proof for the general form of Azuma's inequality listed below. Actually, this can be viewed as a direct corollary of the general form of Azuma's inequality.

A general form of Azuma's inequality

Limitation of the vanilla Azuma's inequality
Note that the vanilla Azuma's inequality requires symmetric bounds on martingale increments, i.e. . So, if known bound is asymmetric, e.g. However, this issue can be resolved and one can obtain a tighter probability bound with the following general form of Azuma's inequality.

Statement
Let  be a martingale (or supermartingale) with respect to  filtration .

almost surely. Then for all ,

Since a submartingale is a supermartingale with signs reversed, we have if instead  is a martingale (or submartingale),

If  is a martingale, since it is both a supermartingale and submartingale, by applying union bound to the two inequalities above, we could obtain the two-sided bound:

Proof
We will prove the supermartingale case only as the rest are self-evident. From , we have

For the inner expectation term, since 
(ii) ;
and (iv) , by applying Hoeffding's lemma, we have

Repeating this step, one could get

	

Remark
Note that by setting , we could obtain the vanilla Azuma's inequality.

Note that for either submartingale or supermartingale, only one side of Azuma's inequality holds. We can't say much about how fast a submartingale with bounded increments rises (or a supermartingale falls).

This general form of Azuma's inequality applied to the Doob martingale gives McDiarmid's inequality which is common in the analysis of randomized algorithms.

Simple example of Azuma's inequality for coin flips
Let Fi be a sequence of independent and identically distributed random coin flips (i.e., let Fi be equally likely to be −1 or 1 independent of the other values of Fi).  Defining  yields a martingale with |Xk − Xk−1| ≤ 1, allowing us to apply Azuma's inequality.  Specifically, we get

For example, if we set t proportional to n, then this tells us that although the maximum possible value of Xn scales linearly with n, the probability that the sum scales linearly with n decreases exponentially fast with n.

If we set  we get:

which means that the probability of deviating more than  approaches 0 as n goes to infinity.

Remark

A similar inequality was proved under weaker assumptions by Sergei Bernstein in 1937.

Hoeffding proved this result for independent variables rather than martingale differences, and also observed that slight modifications of his argument establish the result for martingale differences (see page 9 of his 1963 paper).

See also
 Concentration inequality - a summary of tail-bounds on random variables.

Notes

References

 
 
  (vol. 4, item 22 in the collected works)
 
 
 

Probabilistic inequalities
Martingale theory